The 1900 Drake Bulldogs football team was an American football team that represented Drake University as an independent during the 1900 college football season. In its first season under head coach Charles Best, the team compiled a 6–3 record and outscored opponents by a total of 129 to 45.

Schedule

References

Drake
Drake Bulldogs football seasons
Drake Bulldogs football